Elena Moretti (born 29 June 1987 in Brescia) is an Italian judoka who competes in the women's  category. At the 2012 Summer Olympics, she was defeated in the second round.

References

External links
 
 

Italian female judoka
1987 births
Living people
Olympic judoka of Italy
Judoka at the 2012 Summer Olympics
Mediterranean Games gold medalists for Italy
Competitors at the 2009 Mediterranean Games
Mediterranean Games medalists in judo
21st-century Italian women